This is the discography of Australian actor and singer Jason Donovan.

Albums

Studio albums

Cast recording albums

Compilation albums

Singles

As lead artist

As featured artist

Videos

Video albums

Video singles

Music videos

Notes

References

Discographies of Australian artists
Pop music discographies
Rock music discographies